Allo 'Allo! is a British sitcom television series, created by David Croft and Jeremy Lloyd, starring Gorden Kaye, Carmen Silvera, Guy Siner and Richard Gibson. Originally broadcast on BBC1, the series focuses on the life of a French café owner in the town of Nouvion, during the German occupation of France in the Second World War, in which he deals with problems from a dishonest German officer, local French Resistance, the handling of a stolen painting and a pair of trapped airmen, all while concealing from his wife the affairs he is having with his waitresses.

Croft and Lloyd devised the concept as a parody of BBC wartime drama Secret Army and initially launched the programme with a pilot on 30 December 1982. The sitcom was eventually commissioned following the success of the pilot and ran for nine series between 7 September 1984 until its conclusion on 14 December 1992. Both Lloyd and Croft wrote the scripts for the first six series, while the remainder were handled by Lloyd and Paul Adam. Much like previous sitcoms created by Croft and Lloyd, the programme employed notable elements such as memorable catchphrases and ending credits, cultural clichés, physical humour and visual gags. However, Allo 'Allo! differed from these other sitcoms by featuring overarching plot lines rather than simple stand-alone stories, as well as the device of having actors speaking English but with theatrical foreign accents to distinguish each character's nationality.

The sitcom gained respectable ratings during its run, with its success leading to it receiving stage show reproductions. A special entitled The Return of 'Allo 'Allo!, aired on 22 March 2007, featured cast members returning to reprise their original roles to perform in a special story after the conclusion of the programme. It was accompanied by a documentary about the sitcom, including a highlight reel of episodes and interviews with the cast, production team and fans.

Premise
Allo 'Allo! is set during the Second World War, between the occupation of France by German Axis powers in 1940 and its eventual liberation by Allied forces in July 1944. The story of the sitcom focuses on René Artois, a café owner in Nouvion and a reluctant member of the town's local French Resistance cell who operates under the codename of "Nighthawk". Because of the occupation of the town by German forces, led by the dictatorial Major-General Erich von Klinkerhoffen, René finds himself caught up between dealing with four problems – the scheme and plots of the town's corrupt commandant, Colonel Kurt von Strohm; the sabotage plans of the Resistance's leader Michelle Dubois; the efforts by Gestapo agent Herr Otto Flick to find a stolen painting and unmask Resistance members; and the love affairs with his waitresses, particularly Yvette Carte-Blanche, each of which he must conceal from both his wife Edith Artois and each of the other waitresses.

Throughout the programme's broadcast, the sitcom features a number of overarching storylines, with two of these being the most prominent within episodes. The first, and most prominent, plot concerns the theft of a valuable painting from the town's chateau – The Fallen Madonna by fictional artist van Klomp (usually referred to as "The Fallen Madonna with the Big Boobies") – stolen by von Strohm, and the subsequent effort by him to conceal the theft from his superiors and Herr Flick. René is notably forced into handling the stolen painting out of threat of execution, but also due to being indebted to von Strohm for allowing him to fake his death when he is sentenced to execution for unjustified accusations of aiding the Resistance in an act of sabotage. The painting itself is subjected to being lost during the course of its concealment, before receiving a forged copy upon being found, only for it to be lost again and sought out by not only by von Strohm, but also Herr Flick who, rather than return it to Berlin, intends to keep it himself.

The second storyline concerns the involvement of two stranded British airmen, shot down while over Nouvion. Because of their predicament, several plots in a number of episodes focus on the efforts of Michelle to devise plans that can help to send them back to England, with René not only forced to help hide them within his café or keep them under disguises, but also help in her schemes, sometimes devised by London who relay these plans via a radio installed within the bedroom of Edith's mother. Often, the schemes devised are so complicated that they invariably backfire, especially when they collide with other schemes conducted by von Strohm and his assistants, often leaving him, René and Michelle worse off than before. Most other storylines concern other events, including the efforts to remove von Klinkerhoffen's replacement from power, sabotaging the Germans' plan to invade England, and the subsequent build-up of German concern about an Allied invasion of France following the defeat of Italy.

Lloyd & Croft sitcom elements
As with previous sitcoms created before Allo 'Allo!, such as Lloyd and Croft's earlier collaboration Are You Being Served?, much of the humour is derived from classic elements of comedy including classic farce set-ups, physical comedy and visual gags, alongside a large amount of sexual innuendo, and a fast-paced running string of broad cultural clichés. Like most characters devised for previous sitcoms, the cast for the programme were designed with notable elements to distinguish them throughout the series, be it a catchphrase, gimmick, or saying.

Like previous sitcoms devised by the creators, Allo 'Allo! ends each episode with the caption "You have been watching (in order of appearance)", followed by a short vignette shot of actors who performed in the episode — whether as a main or supporting character — identified by their name in caption within each sequence. Although the shots appear like a clip from the episode, the production team conduct a separate filming session aimed as a reenactment of a scene the actor was involved in, mostly pertaining to a specific camera angle or action conducted by their character, with the vignette sequence often done in order of their first spoken line; the exception to this is that actor Gorden Kaye is always first in the sequence, regardless of when his first appearance is made.

"René Recaps" device
As each episode builds on previous ones, viewers are often required to have followed the series to the episode they have reached in order to understand the plot. As Allo 'Allo! revolved around individual story arcs spread across several episodes, the creators opted for using a comical version of the "As you remember ..." device, commonly used in serials, to act as a recap of events in the current story for the beginning of a new episode. This device within the sitcom was always conducted by René, who would open an episode by breaking the fourth wall (which Michael Bates did in It Ain't Half Hot Mum) to interact with the audience and provide a brief summary of events that had occurred previously, including notable events that had taken place, and also intermittently during episodes to make comic comments. This plot device was rare for comedy (including comedy animation), where plots are prominently gag-driven and self-contained, but its use in Allo 'Allo! had a major impact on audiences connecting with the characters. It also had considerable benefits for re-runs, as it allowed local TV stations who had reshuffled episodes for their schedule, to ensure that their audiences could be aware of the plot events surrounding the story of the episode being broadcast.

"Foreign" languages
One of the trickier problems with Allo 'Allo! was the fact that the main characters were of four different nationalities — French, German, English and Italian. Lloyd and Croft determined that it would be too much for the audience to follow multiple languages, so they employed a simple dramatic device to overcome the issue: all characters would speak English in a theatrical foreign accent depicting the foreign language, while the English characters spoke in equally theatrical 'upper class' English accents. French and German characters could understand each other when speaking, but the English characters could not understand the others without someone "translating" for them and vice versa.

Because of this device, each particular main language for the show required a specific accent and speaking style to be devised. While the French-speaking characters mainly spoke with a French accent, the English-speaking characters mostly employed Bertie Wooster-esque "top-hole, old chap!"-style banter in an upper-class English accent, and German-speaking characters mainly spoke in a guttural manner. When Italian characters were added to the series, particularly Captain Alberto Bertorelli, in the fourth series, the cast members assigned to these roles spoke in a nasal tone, making use of the letter "a" on the ends of certain words (e.g., "What a mistake-a to make-a!").

One of the most notable aspects of the language device was in the speech of the police officer Crabtree, a character introduced in the second series. Because the character was an undercover Englishman with a poor grasp of French, the actor, Arthur Bostrom, spoke perfectly when the character spoke in English, but extensively deployed malapropism to represent when the character was speaking in French. Bostrom therefore altered not all but certain words in his sentences, substituting different vowels and/or consonants, changing them into different or nonsensical words, usually laden with innuendo. An example is the line "I was passing by the door, and I thought I would drop in.", which Bostrom pronounced "I was pissing by the door, and I thought I would drip in". Another example is Crabtree's greeting of "good morning", pronounced "good moaning".

Cast

Characters

Episodes 

After the pilot aired in December 1982, a full-length first series of seven episodes was commissioned and aired from September 1984 onwards. Series two, three and four followed annually, with six episodes each.

Series five was commissioned with a view to syndicating the show in America. As a result, it aired as a single long series of twenty-six episodes between September 1988 and February 1989, with each episode running only twenty-five minutes to allow for commercials. The attempts to air the show in America failed (although screening rights to the series were later sold to PBS), and so series six had only eight episodes commissioned, which aired from September 1989 onwards.

On 25 January 1990, Gorden Kaye suffered serious head injuries in a car crash brought on by gale-force winds. This delayed the start of the seventh series, which consisted of ten episodes airing from January 1991 onwards. Series 8 (7 episodes) followed in January 1992, and the ninth and final series of six episodes aired later that year from November onwards.

Two Christmas specials were also made. The first was a 45-minute episode, which followed Series 2 in 1985, and the second was also a 45-minute episode, screened at Christmas 1991, preceding Series 8.

In 1994, two years after the series ended, the BBC broadcast The Best of 'Allo 'Allo!, a compilation of clips from the series, linked by new scenes featuring Gorden Kaye and Carmen Silvera, in which René and Edith reminisce about the events of the war.

On 22 March 2007, a one-off special episode entitled The Return of 'Allo 'Allo! was filmed in Manchester, and was broadcast on 28 April 2007 at 9 pm on BBC 2. The storyline involves René writing his memoirs after the war, and the events from the final episode in 1992 have been overlooked. The new scenes were interspersed with clips from the original series and new interviews. The actors who reprised their roles were: Gorden Kaye, Vicki Michelle, Sue Hodge, Kirsten Cooke, Arthur Bostrom, Guy Siner, Robin Parkinson, John D. Collins and Nicholas Frankau. In addition, Richard Gibson and Sam Kelly are interviewed, although they are not reprising their respective roles. The only main characters who did not appear in the reunion at all (barring those cases where the actor or actress had died) were Private Helga Geerhart (played by Kim Hartman) and Herr Engelbert von Smallhausen (played by John Louis Mansi). Jeremy Lloyd wrote the new material.

Cultural references 

The show's premise was not to make fun of the war but to spoof war-based film and TV dramas, and in particular the BBC1 drama Secret Army, which ran from 1977 to 1979 and dealt with the activities of a Belgian "escape line" that returned allied pilots to Britain, working from a Brussels café and later restaurant. Many of the elements and characters are directly taken from Secret Army, such as the café owner having an affair in the restaurant under the nose of his wife, a bed-ridden woman in a room above who knocks on the floor for attention, a pianist who is also the forger, and the enmity between the Gestapo and the German military. Many storylines for Allo 'Allo also derive directly from episodes of Secret Army, such as the valuable paintings and the accompanying forgeries, which both the Germans and the Resistance are seeking to obtain in the Secret Army second series episode "Weekend". Some actors from Secret Army also appear in 'Allo 'Allo!: Richard Marner, Guy Siner, John D. Collins, Hilary Minster, David Beckett and Louis Sheldon. Inspiration was also drawn from patriotic black-and-white British melodramas of the 1940s.

The French village setting is reminiscent of 1972's Clochemerle, whilst Rene's intermediary role between the Germans and the Resistance reflects a comic version of Rick from Casablanca (as well as directly matching the proprietor of the café in Secret Army).

Music 
Having a café-cabaret in the plot, music was often performed on the show. This usually took place with Madame Edith singing, and either Lt. Gruber or Leclerc at the piano, played (out of vision) by Roy Moore. Occasionally, characters could also be seen whistling or humming tunes at certain points.

Theme tune 
David Croft and Roy Moore composed the theme tune performed at the start and end of each episode. The title is "'Allo 'Allo", and the first lyrics are:

Carmen Silvera sang the full song and it was released on LP in the 1980s.

Other music 
The café cabaret music usually took the form of 1930s film and show tunes – reminiscent of the way period songs were also used in Secret Army.

Most popular was "Louise" from the film Innocents of Paris (1929), which featured a number of times and was even sung in the "broken-French" language of Crabtree, who pronounced the title "Loo-woes". Gruber sang a number such as "Can't Help Lovin' Dat Man" from Show Boat or "(I Got a Woman Crazy for Me) She's Funny That Way" by Neil Monet and Richard A. Whiting. He gazed at René in a slightly lustful manner, replacing lyrics such as "woman" and "she" with "boy" and "he". He caused a particular sensation with his straight version of Noël Coward's "Mad About the Boy".

Naturally the "La Marseillaise" and the German National Anthem "Deutschlandlied" featured from time to time, for example where several French peasants sang La Marsellaise to celebrate the expected bombing of the Germans, but the singers flawlessly and without hesitation switch to Das Lied der Deutschen when the Germans come past. Helga also sometimes stripped to a rather raunchy version (arranged by Roy Moore) of the latter tune.

Captain Bertorelli could be seen singing "'O Sole Mio (It's Now or Never)"; and the British airmen in a prisoner of war camp could be seen singing "Hitler Has Only Got One Ball".

In 1986, Gorden Kaye and Vicki Michelle released a version of the hit song "Je t'aime... moi non plus". The characters of Yvette and René could be heard talking and canoodling in a comic manner whilst the familiar musical "Je t'aime..."' melody played in the background. The song got to number fifty-seven in the UK Singles Chart.

In 1985, Gorden Kaye and Carmen Silvera appeared in the Royal Variety Performance in character as René and Edith, and sang "I Remember It Well" from Gigi.

Stage show 
The show gave rise to a successful touring stage-show featuring most of the TV cast. This ran from 1986 to 1992, and included three London stage runs as well as international tours.

In January 1990 Gorden Kaye suffered serious head injuries in a car accident. As a result, his understudy, John Larson, played the part in a London Palladium production. Kaye had a dent in his forehead for the rest of his life from a piece of wood that smashed through the car window. He wanted to end the television show after his accident, but was persuaded by Jeremy Lloyd to continue. In Australia Gorden Kaye's part was played by Australian comedian/impressionist Max Gillies (later, Gorden Kaye repaid the favour when he took over Max Gillies' role in another play in Australia, when Max Gillies was unable to take part).

The show was last performed for a summer season at Bournemouth's Pier Theatre in 1996.

In 2007 Gorden Kaye, Sue Hodge and Guy Siner reprised their roles in a production of the stage show in Brisbane, Australia. They were joined by Steven Tandy as Colonel von Strohm and Jason Gann as Herr Flick.

A new touring show, based on the 1992 tour written by David Croft and Jeremy Lloyd, opened at the Gordon Craig Theatre in Stevenage, Hertfordshire on 29 August 2008 before going on a national tour in 2009. Vicki Michelle reprised her role as Yvette Carte-Blanche. The cast also included Jeffrey Holland playing Rene Artois and his wife Judy Buxton playing Michelle Dubois. Other cast members included Robin Sebastian as Gruber, James Rossman as Herr Flick, Nell Jerram as Private Helga Geerhart and Claire Andreadis as Mimi Labonq.

The theatrical version is also frequently performed by amateur theatre companies in the UK and elsewhere.

Locations 

Exterior shooting took place in Norfolk, much of it at Lynford Hall.

Between 1982 and 1987, and from 1989 to 1992, all interior scenes were filmed in front of a studio audience at the BBC Television Centre studios in London. For the fifth series, recorded from December 1987 to August 1988, production moved to BBC Elstree Centre in Studio D. With hopes for a US syndication deal, the BBC planned to make 26 new episodes of the sitcom; hence, a bigger space was needed for the production. Even though the US syndication deal did not go ahead as planned, production remained at BBC Elstree Centre for the remainder of the fifth series. With more space available, the outside set of Café Rene became a semi-permanent structure in the former ATV Garage building.

DVD releases

Australian and New Zealand releases 
In Australia, Roadshow Entertainment, under licence from the BBC began releasing the series on DVD in 2006, on a semi-annual basis. To date, all series have been released on DVD; only The Return of 'Allo 'Allo! TV special remains to be released.

UK releases 
Universal Playback, under licence from the BBC, began releasing the series on DVD in 2002. In the UK six box sets with series 1–9 have been released, as well as a complete box set.

The original UK releases have episode titles superimposed over the openings of the episodes (series 1–4). The 2013 re-release of the complete series box set omits the majority, but not all of these superimposed titles. The American releases have no on-screen episode titles, reflecting the way that the shows were originally transmitted.

North American releases 
In January 2004, BBC Worldwide began releasing the show themselves onto DVD in North America, beginning with Series 1. The releases have continued on a somewhat irregular basis (approximately twice-yearly).

 Note: The Best of 'Allo 'Allo! is included as an extra on the series nine DVDs.

See also 
 Are You Being Served?
 Keeping Up Appearances
 Hogan's Heroes

References

External links 

 Comedy Guide

 
1982 British television series debuts
1992 British television series endings
1980s British sitcoms
1980s British LGBT-related television series
1990s British sitcoms
1990s British LGBT-related television series
Adultery in television
BBC television sitcoms
David Croft sitcoms
English-language television shows
French Resistance
Military comedy television series
Parodies of television shows
Television series by BBC Studios
Television series set in the 1940s
Television shows set in France
Television shows shot at BBC Elstree Centre
Vichy France in fiction
World War II television comedy series